Brisbane Skytower is a  skyscraper at 222 Margaret Street in Brisbane, Queensland, Australia. The 90-storey residential tower is Brisbane's tallest building, and the sixth tallest building in Australia. It is also the largest residential building in the southern hemisphere.

Brisbane Skytower is one of two buildings in the 111+222 development; the other being a 42-storey, five-star Westin hotel at 111 Mary Street which was sold in September 2015 to the Felicity Hotel Group and now known as Mary Lane.

The residential tower includes 1,138 one, two and three-bedroom apartments as well as sub-penthouse and penthouse apartments. A recreation deck, on the 89th floor, features Australia's highest infinity-edge swimming pool.
An eight-level basement car park is included in the project, containing a total of 980 spaces.

The project was developed by Billbergia and AMP Capital with US funds giant Invesco providing debt funding.

History

Hutchinson Builders were appointed to construct the project in early 2016.

In 2017, residents were permitted to begin moving in, before the rest of the building was completed.

Design and location
The building is located in the south of the central business district close to the City Botanic Gardens.  The site was the location for the cancelled Vision Brisbane project.

See also

List of tallest buildings in Australia
List of tallest buildings in Brisbane
List of tallest buildings in Oceania

References

External links 
Building at The Skyscraper Center database
Brisbane Skytower Official Website
Building at Urban database

Gallery

Skyscrapers in Brisbane
Residential skyscrapers in Australia
Skyscraper hotels in Australia
Proposed hotels
Buildings and structures under construction in Australia
Apartment buildings in Brisbane
Margaret Street, Brisbane